Escobedo v. Illinois, 378 U.S. 478 (1964), was a United States Supreme Court case holding that criminal suspects have a right to counsel during police interrogations under the Sixth Amendment. The case was decided a year after the court had held in Gideon v. Wainwright that indigent criminal defendants have a right to be provided counsel at trial.

Background
Danny Escobedo's brother-in-law, Manuel Valtierra, was shot and killed on the night of January 19, 1960. Escobedo was arrested without a warrant early the next morning and interrogated.  However, Escobedo made no statement to the police and was released that afternoon.

Benedict DiGerlando, who was in custody and considered to be another suspect, later told the police that Escobedo had indeed fired the fatal shots because the victim had mistreated Escobedo's sister. On January 30, the police again arrested Escobedo and his sister, Grace. While transporting them to the police station, the police explained that DiGerlando had implicated Escobedo and urged him and Grace to confess. Escobedo again declined, and he asked to speak to his attorney, but the police refused by explaining that although he was not formally charged yet, he was in custody and could not leave. His attorney went to the police station and repeatedly asked to see his client but was repeatedly refused access.

Police and prosecutors proceeded to interrogate Escobedo for fourteen-and-a-half hours and repeatedly refused his request to speak with his attorney. While being interrogated, Escobedo made statements indicating his knowledge of the crime. After conviction for murder, Escobedo appealed on the basis of being denied the right to counsel.

Decision
Escobedo appealed to the Illinois Supreme Court, which initially held the confession inadmissible and reversed the conviction. Illinois petitioned for rehearing, and the court then affirmed the conviction. Escobedo appealed to the US Supreme Court, which overturned the conviction in a 5–4 decision. The majority opinion was written by Justice Arthur Goldberg. The ACLU had argued before the Court as amicus curiae in favor of Escobedo.

Later developments
This holding was later implicitly overruled by Miranda v. Arizona in 1966, and the Supreme Court held that pre-indictment interrogations violate the Fifth Amendment, not the Sixth Amendment.  As Escobedo was questioned during a custodial interrogation, the result for the appellant would have been the same.

In the years following the 1964 decision by the Supreme Court of the United States, Escobedo received 12 felony convictions, including federal charges of selling.  He was also convicted of taking indecent liberties with children.  While free on an appeal bond with respect to those charges, Escobedo pleaded guilty to attempted murder, and he was sentenced to 11 years in prison.

See also
List of United States Supreme Court cases, volume 378
Gideon v. Wainwright
R. v. Brydges

References

Further reading

External links

United States Supreme Court cases
1964 in United States case law
Massiah doctrine case law
Cook County, Illinois
American Civil Liberties Union litigation
United States Supreme Court cases of the Warren Court